John Ruston (4 March 1941 – 30 April 2006) was a New Zealand cricketer. He played in two first-class matches for Canterbury in 1962/63.

See also
 List of Canterbury representative cricketers

References

External links
 

1941 births
2006 deaths
New Zealand cricketers
Canterbury cricketers
Cricketers from Wellington City